The 2007 Open 13 was a men's tennis tournament played on indoor hard courts in Marseille, France, the event was part of the 2007 ATP Tour The tournament was held from February 12 to 18, 2007. Gilles Simon defeated Marcos Baghdatis 6–4, 7–6(7–3).

Seeds

Draws

Finals

Section 1

Section 2

References

External links
 Singles draw
 Singles qualifying draw

- Singles, 2007 Open 13
Open 13 - Singles
Open 13